English singer and songwriter Ellie Goulding has released four studio albums, two remix albums, eight extended plays, 39 singles (including nine as a featured artist), five promotional singles and 39 music videos. As of March 2020, Goulding had sold 15 million albums and 102 million singles worldwide. Additionally, she had sold over 1.5 million albums and over 4.3 million singles (including collaborations) in the United Kingdom alone as of February 2014.

After signing to Polydor Records in July 2009, Goulding released her debut extended play, An Introduction to Ellie Goulding, in December of that year. It was followed by the release of her debut studio album, Lights, in February 2010. The album debuted at number one on the UK Albums Chart and subsequently earned a double platinum certification from the British Phonographic Industry (BPI). It spawned four singles: "Under the Sheets", "Starry Eyed", "Guns and Horses" and "The Writer", which reached numbers 53, four, 26 and 19 on the UK Singles Chart, respectively. In November 2010, the album was re-released as Bright Lights; it featured seven new songs, including a cover version of Elton John's "Your Song", which peaked at number two on the UK Singles Chart. The sixth single to be lifted from the album, "Lights", peaked at number 49 in the United Kingdom, while becoming Goulding's highest-charting single to date in the United States and Canada, where it reached numbers two and seven, respectively.

Goulding's second studio album, Halcyon, was released in October 2012, peaking at number one in the UK and reaching the top 10 in Canada, Germany and the US. It was later certified triple platinum by the BPI and gold by the Recording Industry Association of America (RIAA). The album's lead single, "Anything Could Happen", earned Goulding her third top-five song on the UK Singles Chart when it peaked at number five. The track also became her first charting single in Australia (number 20) and second appearance on the US Billboard Hot 100 (number 47). Subsequent singles "Figure 8" and "Explosions" peaked at numbers 33 and 13 on the UK chart, respectively. In 2013, Goulding was featured on Calvin Harris's single "I Need Your Love", which reached number four in the UK. That same year, her album Halcyon was reissued as Halcyon Days, containing 10 additional tracks. It was preceded by the lead single "Burn", which gave Goulding her first UK number-one single. The song also became an international success, charting inside the top 10 in several countries. Halcyon Days yielded two more singles: a cover of "How Long Will I Love You" by The Waterboys and "Goodness Gracious".

In 2014, Goulding recorded the song "Beating Heart" for the soundtrack to Divergent, and she also released her second collaboration with Calvin Harris, titled "Outside". The following year, she contributed the song "Love Me like You Do" to the soundtrack to Fifty Shades of Grey. "Love Me like You Do" became a commercial success worldwide, earning Goulding her second UK number one and topping the charts in several other countries. Goulding's third studio album, Delirium, was released in November 2015 and peaked at number three in the United Kingdom, the United States and Australia, while reaching the top five in several other countries. The album spawned three singles: "On My Mind", "Army" and "Something in the Way You Move".

Albums

Studio albums

Reissues

Remix albums

Extended plays

Singles

As lead artist

As featured artist

Promotional singles

Other charted songs

Music videos

See also
 List of songs recorded by Ellie Goulding

Notes

References

External links
 
 
 
 

Discographies of British artists
Discography
Pop music discographies